Sagara Gallage (born 10 December 1964) is a Sri Lankan former first-class cricketer who played for Sri Lanka Air Force Sports Club. Later, he became an umpire and stood in matches in the 2007–08 Inter-Provincial Twenty20 tournament.

References

External links
 

1964 births
Living people
Sri Lankan cricketers
Sri Lankan cricket umpires
Sri Lanka Air Force Sports Club cricketers
Sportspeople from Kurunegala